Asian of the Century was a centurial issue of the 20th century held by American AsianWeek magazine and CNN in 1999 that features and profiles Asian persons who have topped their respective fields. Those people featured are considered as "The person who contributed most to the betterment of Asia in the past 100 years'". Mahatma Gandhi was declared as the "Asian of the Century".

The Big Five
The Big Five are:
 Politics and Government: Deng Xiaoping (China)
 Business and Economics: Akio Morita (Japan)
 Arts, Literature and Culture: Akira Kurosawa (Japan)
 Science and Technology: Charles K. Kao (China/[UK]/USA)
 Moral and Spiritual Leadership: Mahatma Gandhi (India)

Contenders
There was a long list of runners-up, such as Rabindranath Tagore (1861–1941), Amartya Sen, Bruce Lee (1940–1973), Chang Min Chueh (1919–1991), Gregory Pincus, M. S. Swaminathan, Rodolfo Aquino, Goh Keng Swee, Li Kuo-ting, Sheikh Mujibur Rahman, Muhammad Yunus, Mother Teresa (1910–1997), the 14th Dalai Lama, Mohammad Ali Jinnah (1876–1948), Mahathir Mohamad, Mao Zedong (1893–1976), Corazon Aquino, and Lee Kuan Yew.

See also
 Time Person of the Year
 Time 100: The Most Important People of the Century
 Canadian Newsmaker of the Year

References

External links
 ASIAN OF THE CENTURY Homepage

Celebrity
CNN